MTV Unplugged is the name of the first live album by Puerto Rican singer Ricky Martin. It was released to the market in CD and DVD formats by Sony BMG Norte on November 7, 2006. It has been certified platinum and gold worldwide.

Background
MTV Unplugged was taped on August 17, 2006 in Miami. It premiered on MTV Latin America, MTV Tr3s and MTV Puerto Rico in October 2006. This album includes Puerto Rican influences, particularly "Tu Recuerdo" (based mainly on a Puerto Rican "aguinaldo jíbaro", and finishing with an "aguinaldo orocoveño") and "Pégate", a Puerto Rican plena. Christian Nieves plays the Puerto Rican cuatro on both tracks.

Formats
The album was re-released as a CD and DVD combo-package in May 2007. An exclusive Wal-Mart packaging was made available with the original CD purchase and a DVD titled "The Making of Ricky Martin MTV Unplugged", which includes a 40-minute behind the scenes documentary and the music video to "Tu Recuerdo". The music video for "Tu Recuerdo" is just an extracted live performance of the song from MTV Unplugged.

Commercial performance
In the United States, MTV Unplugged debuted at number one on the Top Latin Albums and number thirty-eight on the Billboard 200, with first week sales of 29,000 copies. It has also charted inside top ten in Argentina, Spain and Mexico.

MTV Unplugged was certified 2× Platinum Latin award in the United States, Diamond in Mexico, 2× Platinum in Argentina, and Gold in Spain. In the US, it has sold over 197,000 copies.

Three new tracks on the album included: "Tu Recuerdo", which topped the Hot Latin Songs for three weeks and peaked at number eighty-nine on the Billboard Hot 100; "Pégate", second single that peaked at number eleven on the Hot Latin Songs and number six on the Hot Dance Club Songs and "Con Tu Nombre", which peaked at number forty-seven on the Hot Latin Songs. "Gracias por Pensar en Mi" also received airplay in the United States and Mexico. The album has sold over two million copies worldwide.

Accolades

Track listing

Personnel

Raphael Alkins Engineer  
Wanda Berrios Make-Up, Cabelo  
Gustavo Borner Engineer  
Richard Bravo Percussion  
David Cabrera Guitar (Acoustic), Director, Spanish Guitar, Coros  
Andrés Casanova Assistant Engineer  
Albert Centrella Audio Production  
Bob Clearmountain Engineer  
Roger Cooper Product Manager  
Omar Cruz Photography  
Guillermo Cubero Guiro, Pandereta Seguidor  
Mari DeChambao Performer  
Bruno Del Granado Executive Producer  
Roman Diaz Stylist  
Brett Dicus Engineer  
Brandon Duncan Assistant  
Ron Dziubla Saxophone  
Scott Flavin Violin  
Paul Forat A&R  
Chris Glansdorp Cello  
Ted Jensen Mastering  
Hardi Kamsani Digital Editing  
Daniel Lopez Percussion  
Waldo Madera Bateria  
Richard Martinez Pandereta Seguidor  
Hector "Tito" Matos Pandereta Requinto  
Phil McArthur Double Bass, Bajo Sexto  
Christian Nieves Cuatro  
George Noriega Guitar  
Scott ODonnell Viola  
Luis Olazabal Photography  
Alfredo Oliva Violin  
Carlos David Pérez Coros  
Carlos Perez Graphic Design, Creative Director  
Liza Quin Coros  
Luis Aquino Trumpet  
R.J. Ronquillo Guitar (Acoustic), Mandolin, Spanish Guitar  
Erik Noel Rosado  
Charlie Singer Producer, Executive Producer  
Ben Stivers Piano, Wurlitzer  
Jose Tillán Producer/Executive Producer  
Tommy Torres Producer  
Victor Vazquez Trombone  
Mike Rivera Producer Versíon Salsa
Immanuel Ramirez Ingeniero Versíon Salsa
Jose Luis Vega Image Design

Charts

Weekly charts

Monthly charts

Year-end charts

Decade-end charts

Certifications and sales

Album

DVD

Release history

See also
List of number-one Billboard Latin Pop Albums from the 2000s
List of number-one Billboard Top Latin Albums of 2006
 List of best-selling Latin albums

References

Mtv Unplugged (Martin, Ricky album)
Ricky Martin live albums
Ricky Martin video albums
2006 live albums
2006 video albums
Spanish-language live albums
Sony BMG Norte live albums
Sony BMG Norte video albums
Latin Grammy Award for Best Male Pop Vocal Album